Fairhaven is an unincorporated community in Anne Arundel County, Maryland, United States. Maryland Route 423 connects Fairhaven with Maryland Route 2, which goes north to Annapolis, the state capital, and south to Prince Frederick, the county seat of Calvert County.

References

Unincorporated communities in Anne Arundel County, Maryland
Unincorporated communities in Maryland
Maryland populated places on the Chesapeake Bay